The Battle of Sauce of 1816 was a battle between the Luso-Brazilian forces under the command of Pinto de Araújo Correia in Arroyo Oriental, modern-day Uruguay. The engagement resulted of the encounter between the Luso-Brazilian forces that had previously defeated the men of Fructuoso Rivera.

The orientals, led by Artiguist commander Pedro Gutierrez, attack by surprise and caused the Luso-Brazilian army to retreat, leaving 150 soldiers dead on the battlefield.

References

Sauce 1816
Sauce 1816
Sauce 1816
1816 in Portugal
1816 in Brazil
1816 in Uruguay